Dumfries Burghs was a district of burghs constituency of the House of Commons of Great Britain from 1708 to 1801 and of the House of Commons of the Parliament of the United Kingdom from 1801 until 1918. It elected one Member of Parliament (MP).

Creation
The British parliamentary constituency was created in 1708 following the Acts of Union, 1707 and replaced the former Parliament of Scotland burgh constituencies of  Dumfries, Annan,  Kirkcudbright Burgh, Lochmaben and Sanquhar.

Boundaries 
The constituency comprised  the Dumfriesshire burghs of Dumfries, Annan, Lochmaben and Sanquhar and the Kirkcudbrightshire burgh of Kirkcudbright.

History
The constituency elected one Member of Parliament (MP) by the first past the post system until the seat was abolished for the  1918 general election.

 Dumfries, Annan, Lochmaben and Sanquar were then merged into the county constituency of Dumfriesshire. Kirkcudbright was merged into Galloway.

Members of Parliament

Elections

Elections in the 1830s

Elections in the 1840s

Elections in the 1850s

Elections in the 1860s

Elections in the 1870s

Elections in the 1880s

Elections in the 1890s

Reid is appointed Solicitor General for Scotland, requiring a by-election.

Elections in the 1900s

Elections in the 1910s

General Election 1914–15:

Another General Election was required to take place before the end of 1915. The political parties had been making preparations for an election to take place and by the July 1914, the following candidates had been selected; 
Liberal: John Gulland
Unionist: Archibald Mclnnes Shaw

Notes 

Historic parliamentary constituencies in Scotland (Westminster)
Constituencies of the Parliament of the United Kingdom established in 1708
Constituencies of the Parliament of the United Kingdom disestablished in 1918